Dangerous Flights is a documentary-style reality television show that airs on the Discovery Channel. The show follows the pilots of C.B. Aviation as they ferry light aircraft to their new owners across distances the aircraft weren't designed to fly and often over routes that are generally considered to be dangerous by the aviation community.

Cast

Cory Bengtzen (season one - current)
Marcio Lucchese (season one - current)
Brad White (season one - current)
Pete Zaccagnino (season one - current)
Randy McGehee (season one - current)
Dave "Super Dave" Mathieson (season one - current)
Kerry McCauley (season one - current)
Stu Sprung (season one - current)
Yasmina Platt (season one - current)
Bob Raskey (season one - current)
Alex Pichler (season two)
Claire McCauley (season two)

Episodes

Season 1 (2012)

Season 2 (2014)

Incidents

On 24 February 2013, cameraman/director John Driftmier and conservationist Dr. Anthony King were killed in a plane crash in Kenya. Driftmier was shooting footage for Dangerous Flights when the plane, an Aeroprakt A-22L ultralight (registration 5Y-LWF) crashed into the east face of Mount Kenya. Although only a preliminary report has been published thus far, it is believed that a large downdraft forced the ultralight into an unrecoverable descent into the mountain. Driftmier and King were the only occupants.

Broadcast Airings
Repeats of the series are currently airing on the digital broadcast network Quest.

See also

Flying Wild Alaska
Ice Pilots NWT
Alaska Wing Men
Bush Pilots (TV series)
Mayday (TV Series)

References

External links
Dangerous Flights on Discovery Channel
Dangerous Flights on Smithsonian Channel

Dangerous Flights Canada

Discovery Channel (Canada) original programming
Documentary television series about aviation
2010s Canadian reality television series
2012 Canadian television series debuts
2014 Canadian television series endings